PS2 most commonly refers to the PlayStation 2, a sixth-generation video game console manufactured by Sony

PS2, PS-2, Ps 2 or PS/2 may also refer to:

Technology
 IBM Personal System/2, IBM's third generation of personal computers
 PS/2 port, a 6-pin Mini-DIN connector used for connecting some keyboards and mice to a PC compatible computer system

Video games
 Official UK PlayStation 2 Magazine, a predecessor to the PlayStation Official Magazine - UK
 Phantasy Star II, a console role-playing video game developed by Sega AM7
 PlanetSide 2, a massively multiplayer online first-person-shooter video game
 Pokémon Stadium 2, a video game for the Nintendo 64
 Power Stone 2, a multiplayer fighting game for the Sega Dreamcast

Other
 Psalm 2
 pS2 gene, is a gene in humans that encodes the  Trefoil factor 1 protein
 Franklin PS-2, an American, high-wing, strut-braced, single seat glider
 Photosystem II, the first protein complex in the Light-dependent reactions
 PS 2, the name of several public elementary schools in New York City
 Ps2, the chemical formula for di-positronium
Patrick Surtain II, cornerback who plays for the Denver Broncos of the National Football League